Pope John XV of Alexandria (Abba Yoannis El-Mallawany; died 7 September 1629) was the 99th Pope of Alexandria & Patriarch of the See of St. Mark.  Originally from Mallawi, he was a monk in the Monastery of Saint Anthony before being consecrated Patriarch on the 7th day of Thout, 1336 A.M. (September 18, 1619 A.D.).  Known for his great modesty and piety, John XV was devoted to ministry, prayer, and worship.  He exemplified zeal in guiding the Coptic church and in showing compassion to his priests, the poor, and strangers.

In 1623 A.D., John visited and ministered in Upper Egypt, which was suffering under a devastating plague.  In 1629 A.D., another severe epidemic spread through the land, prompting the Pope to make a second trip to Upper Egypt in the second year of the epidemic.  During his return journey to Cairo he stayed in the city of Abnub.  While staying in a house John reportedly rebuked the owner for keeping concubines.  He then became ill, possibly from being poisoned by his host.  John died shortly afterward and was buried in the monastery of the Saint Anba Bishih in El-Bayadia, Egypt.  He was patriarch for nine years, eleven months and twenty-two days.

17th-century Coptic Orthodox popes of Alexandria
1629 deaths